Greco-Islamic tradition (similarly, Greco-Islamic legacy, Greco-Islamic science, Greco-Islamic philosophy, and Greco-Islamic medicine) may refer to:

Scholarship from the Islamic Golden Age, emphasising its roots in Greek philosophy and mathematics:
Islamic science
Islamic medicine
Islamic mathematics
Early Islamic philosophy
The Islamic role in the transmission of Greek philosophical ideas in the Middle Ages